Broeckers, Bröckers, or Brockers is a surname. Notable people with the surname include:

Mathias Bröckers (born 1954), German journalist and author
Michael Brockers (born 1990), American football player

See also
Broecker